Bakhtiyarpur College of Engineering (BCE Patna) is a public institute in Bakhtiyarpur (Patna) run under Department of Science and Technology, Bihar

History 
BCE Patna was established in 2016 by the Government of Bihar via its Department of Science and Technology, Bihar. BCE Patna is recognized by the AICTE and is affiliated to Aryabhatta Knowledge University (AKU). Its first academic session was started in 2016 on the old university grounds of the Indian Institute of Technology Patna in the Pataliputra Housing Colony.

Programs 
The institute offers full-time Bachelor of Technology (B.Tech.) degree programs in specific science and technology disciplines, including four engineering branches.

Departments

Admission 
The Bihar Combined Entrance Competitive Examination Board (BCECEB) conducts an exam based on the Merit List of the Bihar Combined Entrance Competitive Examination.

After 2019, admissions for the state engineering colleges of Bihar are based on JEE-MAIN marks.

Campus  
BCE Bakhtiyarpur's new own campus at Bakhtiyarpur was inaugurated on February 2, 2020. It is about 3.5 km from Bakhtiyarpur Junction railway station by road. This campus is near the Dedaur village area just beside the railway lines. The college has started its 2020 session from this campus along with the temporary campus for GEC Bhojpur and GEC Buxar.

The university grounds are composed by the Academic and Administrative building, the Library building along with a public canteen on ground floor, two male and one female hostels, the principal's residency, the residencies for the professors, security buildings and other offices. It also includes an open theatre, which serves as the cultural, social and activities centre. Sports grounds are located at the center of the campus. Some local houses are next to the campus behind the female hostel. The university is located about 1 km from the main local road.

Photography
 Language Lab
 Computer Science Arena
 Anti-ragging committee

See also 

 List of institutions of higher education in Bihar
 Aryabhatta Knowledge University
 Education in Patna
 Education in Bihar
 Education in India

References

External links 

 Location on Map
 Exam Notice
 news about wi-fi 
 Official website of Bakhtiyarpur College of Engineering
 BCECE Board website
 Aryabhatta Knowledge University website
 DST, Bihar website

Engineering colleges in Patna
Colleges affiliated to Aryabhatta Knowledge University
Engineering colleges in Bihar
2016 establishments in Bihar
Educational institutions established in 2016